Mahmoud Kahil محمود كحيل (1936 - February 11, 2003) was a Lebanese-born British editorial cartoonist.

Life and career

Mahmoud Kahil was born in Tripoli, North Lebanon in 1936.

He enrolled at the American University of Beirut, but dropped out in his sophomore year to work as a graphic designer at an advertising agency in Beirut and pursue cartooning.

Kahil joined the weekly magazine Al Usbu Al-Arabi as a layout designer from 1961 to 1963. While working as an art director for various publications, he also began drawing professional cartoons. From 1963 to 1965 he drew the cartoon strip Busat Al Rih in the children's magazine Shahrazade. In 1965, he moved to the Lissan Al Hal newspaper and started publishing his first political cartoons editorially, remaining with the paper until 1966. Kahil drew cartoons for Mu'assassat Al Hayat from 1966 to 1968 before moving to Dar Annahar from 1968-1971 to work as art director of Al Hasna Magazine. From 1971 to 1973, he was art director for Al-Usbu' Alarabi while also publishing cartoons in the English-language Daily Star newspaper and Monday Morning magazine.

In 1967, Kahil, along with Farid Salman and Roro Breidi, began producing the newsreel series Actualitees Libanaises exclusively for cinemas in Hamra, Beirut. The artists would film the audience entering the cinemas, develop the footage and then screen the clips back to the audience before the film began.

Kahil had a daughter, Dana, and a son, Nazmi. Nazmi was born on the 13th of April 1975, the day the Lebanese Civil War broke out.

Mahmoud Kahil died at the age of 66 from complications during a heart surgery in London on 11 February 2003.

Mahmoud Kahil Award 

On 29 April 2015 an initiative by Mutazz and Rada Sawwaf was launched at the American University of Beirut to create a new comics award for all talent in the Arab world in the field of cartoons, illustrations and graphic design, to be named "The Mahmoud Kahil Award".

The awards categories are:
 Editorial Cartoons ($10,000)
 Graphic Novels ($10,000)
 Comic Strips ($6,000)
 Graphic Illustrations ($5,000)
 Children’s Book Illustrations ($5,000)

Additionally, two honorary awards are made:
 The Lifetime Achievement Hall of fame, recognizing an outstanding dedication and service for a minimum of 25 years in the fields of graphic arts and cartoons
 The Comics Guardian Award, recognizing those who have extensively supported comics  and cartoons in the Arab world through preserving, collecting, promoting, publishing, teaching  or exhibiting this art, and thereby contributing to the cultural heritage of the region.

Mahmoud Kahil stamp
LibanPost has released the Mahmoud Kahil Award stamp as recognition to the artist's legacy. The stamp was presented to Mr & Mrs Sawwaf and Kahil's family by Aouni Kaaki.

Awards
1984 - Best Arab Cartoonist of the year by the Mustapha & Ali Amin journalism award

Media

Mahmoud Kahil Youtube Channel
My Father - blog/films By Dana Mahmoud Kahil
Book published in October 2014 by Nazda Ltd: According to Kahil

References

External links

 The Daily Star: Book and prizes to honor cartoonist Mahmoud Kahil
  agendaculturel.com, Mahmoud Kahil, ou l’art de la caricature
 Understanding the world of political cartoons - Extracts from the book on Mahmoud Kahil Style p. 22 to 28
 Late, Great Political Cartoonist Mahmoud Kahil
 The Big Grin : Nottingham : Mahmoud Kahil Exhibition : July - September 2003
 Pop culture Arab world!: media, arts, and lifestyle, By Andrew Hammond
 So Long America a selection of Kahil cartoons accompany the book
 رحيل كحيل.. أبرز فناني الكاريكاتير السياسي العالمي
 Selection in Arabic of some Kahil on AFKARTOON
 Profile of Kahil on Al Corniche
 Kahil on Eqla3 Forum
 KOTOOB selection of Kahil
 UN Headlines: The last cartoon
 أصحاب الزوايا by Samir Atallah, Annahar Newspaper
 محمود كحيل إبداع لايغيب

Lebanese cartoonists
Lebanese satirists
Lebanese editorial cartoonists
British editorial cartoonists
British satirists
English people of Lebanese descent
1936 births
2003 deaths
Burials at Brookwood Cemetery